Licko Cerje is a village in the municipality of Lovinac, Lika-Senj County, Croatia. In the 2011 census, the population was 88, and there were 40 households in the village.

Historical population
The population has changed over time:

1857: 963
1869: 1,053
1880: 689
1890: 811
1900: 801
1910: 640
1921: 644
1931: 633
1948: 596
1953: 565
1961: 502
1971: 409
1981: 287
1991: 196
2001: 117
2011: 88

References

Populated places in Lika-Senj County